Heid E. Erdrich (born November 26, 1963) is a poet, editor, and writer. Erdrich is Ojibwe enrolled at  Turtle Mountain.

Early life and education
Heid Ellen Erdrich was born in Breckenridge, Minnesota, and was raised in Wahpeton, North Dakota. She comes from a family of seven siblings including sisters Louise Erdrich (well-known contemporary Native writer of fiction, poetry, and nonfiction) and Lise Erdrich (also a published writer). Their father Ralph (German-American) and mother Rita (Turtle Mountain Ojibwe) taught at a Bureau of Indian Affairs boarding school for the Turtle Mountain Band. Their maternal grandfather, Patrick Gourneau, was the tribal chairman of the Turtle Mountain Band of Ojibwe from 1953 to 1959 and fought against Indian termination.

Erdrich graduated from Dartmouth College in 1986 with a B.A. in Literature and Creative Writing. She earned two master's degrees from Johns Hopkins University, one in poetry (1989) and another in fiction (1990). Erdrich holds a PhD in Arts and Sciences in Native American Literature and Writing from Union Institute.

Career
Erdrich has published several volumes of poetry: Fishing for Myth (1997); The Mother's Tongue (2005); National Monuments (2008), which won the Minnesota Book Award; Cell Traffic (2012); and Curator of Ephemera at the New Museum for Archaic Media (2017), which won the Minnesota Book Award in 2018. She has also written short stories and nonfiction. In 2016, Erdrich's "every-blest-thing-seeing-eye" was named the Winter Book by the Minnesota Center for Book Arts. More recently, Erdrich has garnered attention and won awards from Co-Kisser Poetry Festival and Southwestern Association for Indian Artists for her video-poems or poem films—short, collaborative pieces treating contemporary indigenous themes including the Idle No More movement. One of the central collaborators in these video-poems is painter and digital media artist Jonathan Thunder.  

Some of her video-poem works include: 
 Od'e Miikan-Heart Line (Moose version)                     
 It Was Cloudy                    
 Undead Faerie Goes Great with India Pale Ale                                                
 Lexiconography 1                
 Pre-Occupied                                          
 Indigenous Elvis Works the Medicine Line

In addition to her own writing, Erdrich also promotes the work of other Native American authors. She is a guest editor at the Yellow Medicine Review, a journal devoted to indigenous literature and art; and she co-edited a volume of writing by Native American women with Navajo poet Laura Tohe. Her second anthology, New Poets of Native Nations, featuring Native poets who have published first books since the year 2000, was published by Graywolf Press in 2018. Scholar Scott Andrews reviewed the book stating that "These new poets of Native nations carry their voices into an indigenous future that settler colonialism tried to foreclose and that mainstream publishing too seldom recognizes," and noting that it was the first "substantial anthology of US Native poetry" since 1988.

With her sister Louise, she founded The Birchbark House fund at the Minneapolis Foundation, with the intent of supporting Native writing and Native language revitalization.  Erdrich teaches writing in the Augsburg University low-residency MFA Creative Writing program, which is dedicated to advancing the work and careers of aspiring writers. Erdrich also directs Wiigwaas Press, which publishes books in Ojibwe (Anishinaabe), as well as films and other media.

Curatorial practice 
In addition to being a poet, writer, and editor, Erdrich also has curated museum exhibitions in the Twin City area and across the nation. She is currently guest curator at Amherst College's Mead Museum. One early exhibition was part of the larger series called "Greening the Riverfront" which is a project aimed at exploring the history and transformation of the Minneapolis Riverfront. Erdrich's curation of this exhibit "fed a broader arterial network of Ojibwe and Indigenous women artists and activists who have worked to make visible the continuing claims of this and other threatened riverine systems " (Bernardin, 2017, pp. 39).

Publications
 
 
 
 
  
 
 
 
 Erdrich, Heid E. (2018). Curator of Ephemera at the New Museum for Archaic Media. Michigan State University Press. .
Erdrich, Heid E. (2018). New Poets of Native Nations. Graywolf Press. 
Erdrich, Heid E. (2020). Little Big Bully. Penguin Random House. ISBN 9780143135920

Awards and teaching
Her honors include a National Poetry Series award, two Minnesota Book Awards and a Native Arts and Cultures National Fellowship.

Erdrich has taught at Johns Hopkins University (1989-1992) and was tenured at the University of St. Thomas where she taught until 2007. Since leaving full-time teaching, Erdrich has taught at Augsburg University in the MFA in writing low-residency program and elsewhere. She was the 2019 Distinguished Visiting Professor in Liberal Arts at University of Minnesota Morris, the Glasgow Writer-in-Residence for Washington and Lee University in 2021, and the Elliston poet-in-residence at the University of Cincinnati in 2022. Also in 2022, Erdrich taught for a term in NAIS at Dartmouth College. She has also taught workshops for Native writers at Turtle Mountain Community College, along with her sister Louise.

Erdrich directs Wiigwaas Press, an Ojibwe language publisher. She has received two Minnesota Book Awards, as well as fellowships and awards from the National Poetry Series, Native Arts and Cultures Foundation, McKnight Foundation, Minnesota State Arts Board, Bush Foundation, Loft Literary Center, First People’s Fund, and others. From 2014 to 2022, she  taught in the low-residency MFA creative writing program at Augsburg University. She was the 2019 Distinguished Visiting Professor in Liberal Arts at University of Minnesota Morris.

References

Further reading

External links

1963 births
Living people
Native American poets
Native American women writers
Ojibwe people
Native American short story writers
20th-century American poets
20th-century American short story writers
20th-century American women writers
21st-century American poets
21st-century American short story writers
21st-century American women writers
American people of German descent
American people of French descent
People from Breckenridge, Minnesota
People from Wahpeton, North Dakota
Poets from Minnesota
Poets from North Dakota
Dartmouth College alumni
Johns Hopkins University alumni
Johns Hopkins University faculty
Augsburg University faculty
University of St. Thomas (Minnesota) faculty
American women academics
American women curators
American curators